Claude Michelet (30 May 1938 – 26 May 2022) was an award winning French author and film writer.

Biography 
Michelet, the son of the French politician Edmond Michelet, was born in Brive-la-Gaillarde, France and his first novel "La Terre qui demeure" was released in 1965.

He died on 26 May 2022 at the age of 83 at his home in the hamlet of Marcillac.

Awards and honors 
 1972 Prix des écrivains combattants for Mon père Edmond Michelet
 1975 Prix des Volcans for J’ai choisi la terre
 1979 Prix Eugène Le Roy for Des grives aux loups
 1984 Prix Paulée de Meursault
 Knight of the National Order of the Legion of Honour
 Commander of the National Order of Merit

References

1938 births
2022 deaths
20th-century French male writers
21st-century French male writers
People from Brive-la-Gaillarde
Chevaliers of the Légion d'honneur
Commanders of the Ordre national du Mérite
Prix des libraires winners